Ansar Al-Furqan (Partisans of the Criterion) is a Sunni Baloch militant organization active in Sistan and Baluchestan insurgency and a designated terrorist organization by Iran. The group was established in December 2013 by a merger of Harakat al-Ansar and Hizbul-Furqan.

According to Terrorism Research & Analysis Consortium, they have ties to Katibat al Asad Al ‘Islamia, Jeish Muhammad, Al-Nusra Front and Jaish ul-Adl.

During the 2017-18 Iranian protests, Ansar Al-Furqan claimed responsibility for bombing an oil pipeline in  Ahvaz, a city located in Iran's Khuzestan province.

They also took responsibility for 2018 Chabahar suicide bombing which killed two people and injured around 48 others.

References

Baloch militant groups
Militant opposition to the Islamic Republic of Iran
Organisations designated as terrorist by Iran
Jihadist groups in Pakistan
Salafi Jihadist groups
Qutbist organisations
Sunni Islamist groups